Ohio's 4th congressional district spans sections of the central part of the state. It is currently represented by Republican Jim Jordan, the current chair of the House Judiciary Committee, who has represented the district since 2007.

Areas represented

Counties represented
Allen
Ashland
Auglaize
Champaign
Delaware (partial)
Logan
Hardin
Marion
Morrow
Richland
Shelby (partial)
Union
Wyandot (partial)

Cities within the district
Ashland
Bellefontaine
Columbus (partial)
Delaware
Dublin (partial)
Lima
Mansfield
Marion
Marysville
Westerville (partial)

History of district boundaries
From 2003 to 2013 the district included the counties of Allen, Auglaize, Champaign, Hancock, Hardin, Logan, Marion, Morrow, Richland, Shelby, and part of Wyandot.

Gerrymandering
As part of the 2010 redistricting process, it was redrawn from the previous district to stretch from Lima, to include the northwestern suburbs of Columbus, up to Tiffin and Elyria on the shores of Lake Erie.

In May 2019, a panel of three federal judges ruled that Ohio's congressional district map was unconstitutional and based on gerrymandering.  A new map was expected ahead of the 2020 election. However, after the U.S. Supreme Court ruled in Rucho v. Common Cause that courts could not review allegations of gerrymandering, the district boundaries will not change until congressional district maps are redrawn in 2022.

List of members representing the district

Recent election results

Election results from presidential races

See also
List of United States congressional districts

References

 Congressional Biographical Directory of the United States 1774–present

04
Constituencies established in 1813
1813 establishments in Ohio